Latham Gaines (born February 3, 1964)  is an American composer, actor, artist and inventor.  He is the son of the novelist Charles Gaines and artist Patricia Ellisor Gaines.

Composing and Musical Sculptures

As 1/2 of the duo GAINES, Gaines and brother Shelby Gaines create sound sculpture from 'found' materials.  Their pieces have been featured in several NY Art Shows and their live performance of their original score in Ethan Hawke’s revival of Sam Shepard’s A Lie of the Mind earned them a Drama Desk Award nomination in 2010. They collaborated with Hawke again in 2013, creating the sound doors that provided the soundtrack for "Clive" - Jonathan Marc Sherman's latter-day variation on Brecht's "Baal".

Most recently, Latham and his brother built 5 new instruments from found objects and used them to create the original score for the upcoming 2019 film The Kid from Mimran Schur Pictures, directed by Vincent D'Onofrio.

Inventing

In 2008, Gaines and his partner, Laura Interval, established "Opi and Me, LLC", a product development company specializing in licensing toys and game concepts to companies worldwide. They have had dozens of products produced and on the shelves including Mattel's SpinShotz, Canal's Power Dough, and Schmidt Spiele's Ligretto Twist.

Acting career

Gaines moved to New Zealand in 1995.  Some memorable roles include Mesogog / Dr. Anton Mercer in Power Rangers Dino Thunder and  "Bill Burke" in Bridge To Terabithia. Gaines also starred in the TVNZ series The Cult, earning a nomination for  "Best Performance by an Actor"  at the Qantas Film and Television Awards for his portrayal of "Edward North".

Filmography

References

External links

New York Times Review of Clive

1964 births
Male actors from Birmingham, Alabama
American male film actors
American male television actors
American male voice actors
American expatriate male actors in New Zealand
Living people
American expatriates in New Zealand
21st-century American inventors